This is a list of public holidays in the Faroe Islands.

References

Faroe Islands
Faroe Islands
Daroe Islands